COSMO-1 or COSMO-SkyMed 1 is an Italian radar imaging satellite. Launched in 2007, it was the first of four COSMO-SkyMed satellites to be placed into orbit. The spacecraft is operated by the Italian Space Agency (ASI), in conjunction with Italy's Ministry of Defence. It uses synthetic-aperture radar to produce images for civilian, commercial and military purposes.

Spacecraft description 
COSMO-1 was constructed by Thales Alenia Space, based on the PRIMA (PRecursore IperSpettrale della Missione Applicativa) satellite bus. It was the first PRIMA-based spacecraft to be launched. Designed for a five-year mission.

Launch 
ASI awarded Boeing a contract to launch COSMO-1, with the launch being subcontracted to United Launch Alliance when it was formed to take over Delta launch operations. The launch took place at 02:34:00 UTC on 8 June 2007. A Delta II launch vehicle in the 7420-10C configuration, flight number Delta 324, lifted off from SLC-2W at Vandenberg Air Force Base, successfully injecting the satellite into low Earth orbit. Spacecraft separation occurred 58 minutes and 5 seconds after liftoff.

Mission 
The satellite operates in a Sun-synchronous orbit. It has an orbital period of 97.16 minutes.

References 

Satellites of Italy
Spacecraft launched in 2007
Space synthetic aperture radar